"El Verdadero Amor Perdona" (English: "True Love Forgives") is the third single from Mexican Latin pop/Rock en Español band Maná's eighth studio album Drama y Luz.  The song also features a bachata duet with Prince Royce on their Deluxe Edition of Drama y Luz album. The song is produced by Fher Olvera & Alex González and won for Collaboration of the Year and Rock/Alternative Song of the Year at the Premio Lo Nuestro 2013.

Music video
The music video for the song, which was directed by Pablo Croce and shoot at the El Charco del Ingenio botanical a botanical garden just outside Guanajuato, Mexico. This video features a DINA S.A. bus (probably a coach).

Charts

Weekly charts

Year-end charts

Decade-end charts

See also
 List of number-one Billboard Top Latin Songs of 2011
 List of Billboard number-one Latin songs of 2012

References

2011 singles
Maná songs
Spanish-language songs
Songs written by Fher Olvera
Prince Royce songs
Bachata songs
Warner Music Latina singles
2011 songs